The Dusek family is a professional wrestling family. The Dusek Family real surname is Hason. The Dusek family started with four brothers Ernie, Emil, Joe, and Rudy Dusek. The other two members are Wally and Frank Dusek. Both men are not Dusek by blood their last names are Santen. Wally is the father of Frank. The Dusek brothers were often known as The Dusek Riot Squad. The Dusek brothers were well known in the Omaha, Nebraska territory. The Dusek family also wrestled and did very well in the New York territory. When Ernie Dusek got injured in a car accident he was replaced by Wally Dusek who was introduced as a cousin. The Dusek Brothers (Emil and Ernie) were inducted into the Professional Wrestling Hall of Fame and Museum in 2008.

Members

Ernie Dusek
Ernie Dusek was born in Omaha, Nebraska on January 26, 1909, to Anton and Maria Hason, Bohemian immigrants. Ernie wrestled with his brothers Rudy and Emil in the New York territory during 1933 to 1940. Ernie was the NWA Texas Heavyweight Champion until he was beaten by the legendary Lou Thesz in Houston. Ernie was a very accomplished wrestler he wrestled many famous wrestler's such as Warren Bockwinkel, George Zaharias, Lou Thesz, Wladek Zbyszko, Yvon Robert, Karl Sarpolis, Sandor Szabo, Mike Mazurki, Abe Coleman, and Man Mountain Dean. He won the NWA Southern Tag Team Championship Mid-Atlantic version 2 times with his brother Emil. He would also go on to win the NWA Canadian Open Tag Team Championship with his brother Emil in Toronto against Tiny Mills and Al Mills.  Ernie died in Omaha, Nebraska, on April 11, 1994.

Emil Dusek
Emil Dusek was born in Omaha, Nebraska on March 31, 1905. Emil wrestled with his brothers Rudy and Ernie in the New York territory during 1934 to 1940. Emil wrestled legends Danno O'Mahony and Ed Lewis and would go on to lose to both men. He won the NWA Southern Tag Team Championship Mid-Atlantic version two times with his brother Ernie. He would also go on to win the NWA Canadian Open Tag Team Championship with his brother Ernie in Toronto against Tiny Mills and Al Mills.  Emil died on July 09, 1986.

Rudy Dusek
Rudy Dusek was born on January 25, 1901, in Omaha, Nebraska. Rudy wrestled with his brothers Emil and Ernie in the New York territory during 1933 to 1940. Rudy wrestled for the NYSAC Heavyweight Title against Jim Browning. Rudy wrestled George Zaharias to a curfew draw at St. Nicholas Arena. Rudy wrestled for over an hour with Karol Zbyszko to a draw. Rudy has faced many legendary wrestlers in his day such as Jim Londos, Steve Casey, George Zaharias, Ed Lewis, and Sandor Szabo.  He was defeated by the Bulgarian Dan Koloff in 1919. Rudy died on October 27, 1971.

Joe Dusek
Joe Dusek was born in Omaha, Nebraska, on December 12, 1910. Joe wrestled with his brothers Rudy, Ernie, and Emil in the New York territory during 1935 to 1940. Joe would go on to wrestle Ed Lewis but lost. Joe would also wrestle French great Yvon Robert but this would end in a draw. As a promoter Joe would give Tim Woods the name Mr. Wrestling.  Joe died on October 31, 1992, in Omaha, Nebraska.

On November 28,2018 Joe was inducted into the Omaha Pro Wrestling Hall Of Fame at the PWP Live "Wrestlerama" event at The Waiting Room Lounge in Omaha

Non-related Duseks

Wally Dusek
Wally Dusek was the stage name of professional wrestler Charlie Santen. Born on August 10, 1909. Though billed as the brother of The Dusek Family when they teamed, he is not related to the Dusek family. Wally was trained by famed wrestler John Pesek. Wally was a road agent and an announcer for Jim Crockett's Mid-Atlantic Championship Wrestling before retiring. Wally died on October 29, 1991.

Frank Dusek
Frank Dusek (sometimes billed as "Captain" Frank Dusek) was the stage name of professional wrestler Frank Santen. Son of Wally Dusek (Charlie Santen). He wrestled and was a television commentator and figurehead matchmaker for World Class Championship Wrestling while the company was shown on ESPN. Frank won the NWA Southern Heavyweight Championship defeating Barry Windham.  Dusek also appeared as a commentator for the Universal Wrestling Federation.

Championships and accomplishments

Cauliflower Alley Club
Family Award (2000)
Central States Wrestling
NWA Central States Heavyweight Championship (1 time) – Joe Dusek
NWA World Tag Team Championship (Central States version) (3 times) – Emil and Ernie Dusek
Championship Wrestling from Florida
NWA Southern Heavyweight Championship (Florida version) (1 time) – Frank Dusek
International Wrestling Association (Montreal)
IWA International Heavyweight Championship (1 time) – Ernie Dusek
Maple Leaf Wrestling
NWA Canadian Open Tag Team Championship (1 time) – Emil and Ernie and Dusek
Mid-Atlantic Championship Wrestling
NWA Southern Tag Team Championship (Mid-Atlantic version) (2 times) – Emil and Ernie Dusek
NWA Southwest Sports
NWA World Tag Team Championship (Texas version) (1 time) – Frank Dusek and Bill Irwin
NWA San Francisco
NWA World Tag Team Championship (San Francisco version) (1 time) – Emil and Ernie Dusek
Professional Wrestling Hall of Fame
Class of 2008 – Emil and Ernie Dusek
Southwest Sports
Texas Heavyweight Championship (1 time) – Ernie Dusek
Wrestling Observer Newsletter
Wrestling Observer Newsletter Hall of Fame (Class of 1996 – The Dusek Family)

References

External links
Dusek Riot Squad at OnlineWorldofWrestling.com
Frank Dusek, Wrestling Guru
Emile Dusek at OnlineWorldofWrestling.com
Danny Dusek at OnlineWorldofWrestling.com
Ernie Dusek at OnlineWorldofWrestling.com
Frank Dusek at OnlineWorldofWrestling.com
Wally Dusek at OnlineWorldofWrestling.com
Gary Will's Canadian Pro Wrestling Page of Fame: Al Mills & Tiny Mills
The Dusek Riot Squad at the Professional Wrestling Hall of Fame

Independent promotions teams and stables
Professional wrestlers from Nebraska
Professional wrestling families
American people of Czech descent
Professional Wrestling Hall of Fame and Museum
Stampede Wrestling alumni